Mirza Soleyman Khan Shirazi, known as Roknolmolk, (1839-1914) was the governor's  deputy of Isfahan. He was also a poet and founder of Mohammad Jafar Abadei Tekyeh and Roknolmolk mosque in Takht-e Foulad. His tomb is in the Roknlmolk mosque.

References 

1839 births
1914 deaths
19th-century Iranian politicians
People from Shiraz
People of Qajar Iran
Burials at Takht-e Foulad
19th-century Iranian poets